The flood of 1916 or Zuiderzeevloed of 1916 is a flood that took place in the night between 13 and 14 January 1916 in the Netherlands along the dikes of the Zuiderzee as a result of a storm surge.

Course 
The flood coincided with a high water inflow of rivers causing many ruptures and structural damage in levees at dozens of places along the coastline. Some wooden houses on the island of Marken completely tumbled over. In the province North Holland 19 people were killed, while at sea several ships were wrecked causing another 32 casualties. Queen Wilhelmina visited the areas that were hit.

Consequences 
This disaster, in combination with the famine caused by the First World War, led to a law called the Zuiderzeewet. The reinforcement of the levees, undertaken after the disaster, was finished in 1926. In 1932, the Zuiderzee was 'tamed' by constructing a 32-kilometre long levee, a barrage called the Afsluitdijk. For the fishermen, this also led to the end of their fishing activities.

Foreign help 
Based on the correspondence in The Hague between the ambassador of Turkey to the government of the Netherlands, the Turks donated a sum of FL 2387.90 (equivalent of about €20,000 now) to the Netherlands in aid for the victims of the flood.

References 

20th century in the Netherlands
History of North Holland
Floods in the Netherlands
1916 natural disasters
1916 floods in Europe
January 1916 events
1916 in the Netherlands
1916 disasters in the Netherlands